Hysterocladia unimana is a moth of the family Megalopygidae. It was described by Walter Hopp in 1943. It is found in Brazil.

References

Moths described in 1943
Megalopygidae